A History of American Magazines is a non-fiction book by Frank Luther Mott. It won the 1939 Pulitzer Prize for History.

References 

Pulitzer Prize for History-winning works